David Sills V (born May 29, 1996) is an American football wide receiver for the New York Giants of the National Football League (NFL). 

As a seventh-grade quarterback in 2010, he garnered national attention when he verbally committed to play football at the University of Southern California. In 2014, Sills decommitted from USC and eventually signed a national letter of intent to play at West Virginia University. Sills began his college career as a quarterback, but moved to wide receiver as a freshman. After spending his freshman year playing for the West Virginia Mountaineers, Sills transferred to El Camino College, but transferred back to West Virginia in 2017. He led the nation that season in touchdown receptions and was a first-team 2017 College Football All-America Team selection by Sporting News, Sports Illustrated and CBS Sports for the 2017 West Virginia Mountaineers. He led the 2018 Big 12 Conference in touchdowns and was named 2018 All-Big 12 Conference football team first-team selection as well as a Second-team 2018 College Football All-American by the Walter Camp Football Foundation and American Football Coaches Association.

Early life
Sills was born in 1996. His parents are Denise and David Sills IV.  He has two older sisters, Emma and Abby. His father is a commercial developer and contractor, who played cornerback for the Virginia Military Institute. He began playing youth football at age six and began training at age nine with quarterback trainer Steve Clarkson.

Lane Kiffin offered Sills a scholarship to play college football at USC in 2010. Sills gave USC a non-binding verbal commitment in 2010. Sills was among the youngest football players to receive a scholarship offer from a major football program.

High school career
As a high school freshman, Sills was the starting quarterback for Red Lion Christian Academy, a private Delaware school for grades K-12.  Sports Illustrated hailed him as one of the greatest prospects ever, and Bloomberg News described him as the "best arm money can buy". At Red Lion in 2010, he accumulated 1,355 passing yards and nine touchdowns against five interceptions in eight games.  In 2011, he totalled 2,340 yards and 28 touchdowns in what was his second year as a varsity quarterback. He was named a MaxPreps.com U.S. Air Force second-team freshman All-American.

As a sophomore, Sills became the quarterback for Eastern Christian Academy (ECA) of Elkton, Maryland. The move was controversial because the school was a newly-formed online school. All enrolled boys were on the 46-man football team established by David Sills IV to showcase their talents to college scouts. Eastern Christian Academy was only able to play in three games in 2012 due to the school's failure to gain accreditation from the state. As a junior, Sills injured his knuckle and his delivery was impacted forever. 

Lane Kiffin, who had originally offered Sills a scholarship back in 2010, was fired by USC in 2013. He was replaced by Ed Orgeron on an interim basis. Eventually, USC would hire Steve Sarkisian to become the new head coach. According to Sills' father, Sarkisian told his son that USC would honor their scholarship offer. While receiving reassurance from Sarkisian, the Sillses got the feeling that David wasn't USC's first option. USC had offered and eventually signed two highly ranked quarterbacks in the same class, Sam Darnold and Ricky Town. Sills decommitted from USC in June 2014.

College career

West Virginia
On July 16, 2014, Sills announced his commitment to West Virginia University via Twitter. Sills was one of West Virginia's early enrollees from the 2015 recruiting class. As a result, he was able to participate in spring practice. He battled fellow quarterbacks Skyler Howard, William Crest Jr. and Chris Chugunov for the starting quarterback spot. Howard was eventually named the starting quarterback. Sills earned playing time as a wide receiver after impressing coaches with his performance on the scout team. On October 17, 2015, Sills made his collegiate debut against the Baylor Bears. He finished the game with two receptions for 64 yards. His second collegiate reception was a 35-yard touchdown. He made the game-winning touchdown reception in the 2016 Cactus Bowl against Arizona State and ended the season with seven receptions for 131 yards.

During spring drills in 2016, Sills split time between quarterback and wide receiver. After West Virginia's 2016 spring game, West Virginia head coach Dana Holgorsen stated that Howard solidified his position as the starting quarterback and that Crest and Chugunov would continue to battle for the backup quarterback spot. With several quarterbacks ahead of him on the depth chart and former Florida starting quarterback Will Grier scheduled to become eligible to play for the Mountaineers in 2017, it appeared unlikely Sills would ever get an opportunity to play quarterback at West Virginia.

El Camino College
On June 23, 2016, Sills announced he would transfer to El Camino College. He spent seven months on the couch of high school friend Khaliel Rodgers who was on the USC roster as an offensive lineman at the time. In his lone season playing for the Warriors, Sills played quarterback and threw for 1,636 yards and 15 touchdowns.

Return to West Virginia
On December 15, 2016, West Virginia football announced on Twitter that Sills would be returning to West Virginia. In West Virginia's 2017 spring game, Sills lined up at wide receiver and caught six passes for 98 yards from Will Grier. In the September 3 season opener for the 2017 West Virginia Mountaineers against the 21st-ranked Virginia Tech Hokies Sills posted nine receptions for 94 yards and two touchdowns in a losing effort against the Hokies. On September 9, Sills posted seven catches for a career-high 153 yards and a career-high three touchdowns against East Carolina. He then tallied 130 yards and two touchdowns against Kansas on September 23. Following the Kansas game and a bye week Sills was tied for the national lead in touchdown receptions with seven in his first four games and then he added two touchdown receptions on October 7 against TCU, bringing his total to nine. Sills added three more touchdown receptions on October 14 against Texas Tech extending his national lead. Sills' three receiving touchdowns on October 21 in a 38–36 victory over Baylor gave sills a total of 15 for the season, which continued to lead the nation. Sills made his 17th and 18th touchdown catches of the season on November 11 against Kansas State. However, in the following game, starting quarterback Grier was lost for the season, and Sills finished the season with 18 touchdowns.

As a junior, Sills received numerous honors. On November 13, he was one of three 2017 Big 12 Conference football wide receivers named as a semifinalist for the Biletnikoff Award (along with James Washington and Keke Coutee).  A week later he was named as one of three finalists for the award (along with Washington and Michael Gallup). On November 30, Sills was the only member of the 2017 West Virginia Mountaineers football team named to the 2017 All-Big 12 Conference football first team. Sills finished the season as the NCAA Division I Football Bowl Subdivision touchdown receptions leader with 18 (tied with Anthony Miller). Sills earned 2017 College Football All-America Team first-team recognition from Sports Illustrated, Sporting News and CBS Sports. Sills also earned several second-team All-American honors, including Associated Press, Walter Camp Football Foundation, SB Nation, College Football News, and American Football Coaches Association. Sills decided to return to play his senior season with Grier.

Sills entered the season on watchlists for the Maxwell Award, Fred Biletnikoff Award, and Walter Camp Award. With Grier back for their senior seasons, Sills opened up the season with a seven-catch, 140-yard, two-touchdown effort in a victory over Tennessee. The Mountaineers schedule was cut short one game when Hurricane Florence caused a cancellation of the September 15 game at NC State. On September 22, Sills tallied three touchdowns against Kansas State. Sills also had 2-touchdown performances against Baylor (139 yards) on October 25, Texas on November 3, and Oklahoma (131 yards) on November 23. Sills' 15 touchdowns led the Big 12. Following the season, he was a 2018 All-Big 12 Conference football team first-team selection. Sills earned 2018 College Football All-America Team second-team recognition by the Walter Camp Football Foundation and, American Football Coaches Association. He earned third-team recognition from the Associated Press.

Professional career

Buffalo Bills 
Sills signed with the Buffalo Bills as an undrafted free agent on April 27, 2019. He was waived by the Bills on August 31, 2019.

New York Giants 
On September 1, 2019, Sills was signed to the New York Giants practice squad. On December 17, 2019, Sills was promoted to the active roster. He was placed on the reserve/COVID-19 list by the Giants on July 28, 2020, and activated from the list seven days later. On September 4, 2020, Sills was placed on the injured reserve list after fracturing his foot during training camp. He was placed on the reserve/COVID-19 list by the team on December 30, 2020, and moved back to injured reserve on January 7, 2021. He signed a contract extension with the team on January 7 thru the 2021 season.

On August 31, 2021, Sills was waived by the Giants and re-signed to the practice squad the next day. On October 23, 2021, Sills was signed to the active roster. He was waived on October 26, 2021, and re-signed to the practice squad. On January 8, 2022, Sills was promoted to the active roster.

On March 11, 2022, Sills re-signed with the Giants.

He surpassed 100 career receiving yards in Week 7 against the Jacksonville Jaguars, when he recorded a 19-yard reception that increased his career total from 99 to 118 receiving yards. He was released on December 31, 2022. He signed back with the team’s practice squad on January 3, 2023. He signed a reserve/future contract on January 26, 2023.

See also
2017 College Football All-America Team

Notes

External links
 West Virginia Mountaineers profile
 El Camino College Warriors profile

1996 births
Living people
American football quarterbacks
American football wide receivers
Buffalo Bills players
El Camino Warriors football players
New York Giants players
Players of American football from Wilmington, Delaware
West Virginia Mountaineers football players